The fourth season of Latin American Idol premiered on September 9, 2009. This season brought new changes as host Monchi Balestra and judge Gustavo Sánchez left the show. The show was hosted by Erika de la Vega. Jon Secada and Mimi returned as judges, and Oscar Mediavilla, an Argentine producer, joined as a new judge.

The auditions for Season 4 were in July 2009. There was a form to fill in the Latin American Idol MySpace site to try for auditions for 2009. Auditioners had to be between the ages of 18 to 28 by August 1, 2009.

Audition dates and places for Season 4 were:

July 4, 2009 - Argentina
July 11, 2009 - Venezuela
July 18, 2009 - Mexico
July 25, 2009 - Costa Rica

Top 12 finalists

Weekly Themes 
Week 1 (October 14) - My Idol
Week 2 (October 21) - Mexican Pop
Week 3 (October 28) - Hits from the 90s
Week 4 (November 4) - Telenovela Openings
Week 5 (November 11) - Reggaeton
Week 6 (November 18) - Juan Luis Guerra
Week 7 (November 25) - Top 5 Hits
Week 8 (December 2) - Renewed Hits of Latin Music

Top 20 (Semifinals)
The Top 20 semifinalists were announced on September 24, 2009, at the end of the Theater Round. The format for the semifinals workshops this season will change having 10 male semifinalists and 10 female semifinalists who will sing in 2 separate rounds by gender, were the Top 5 from each gender will get through to the Finals. The guys will perform on September 30, and the girls on October 7 with results show on the following night. The names of the semifinalists are:

Elimination Chart

References

External links
 Official website

Latin American Idol
2009 television seasons
2009 in Latin music